Holcocranum is a genus of true bugs in the family Artheneidae. There are at least two described species in Holcocranum.

Species
These two species belong to the genus Holcocranum:
 Holcocranum diminutum Horvath, 1898
 Holcocranum saturejae (Kolenati, 1845)

References

Further reading

 
 

Lygaeoidea
Articles created by Qbugbot